The Paddy Lincoln Gang is a 2012 British drama film written and produced by Alistair Audsley, and directed by Ben Jagger. The film stars Dean S. Jagger, Joseph DiMasso, Stephen Bridgewater, Amy Lawhorn and Glen Matlock. Principal photography began on 2 November 2011. The film premiered in competition at the 2012 SoCal Film Festival.

Plot
The Paddy Lincoln Gang are an emerging rock band on the verge of huge success. But their complex and troubled Irish lead singer is haunted by his own paranoia and suspicions that something is not right with the band, his manager or his girlfriend.

Cast
 Dean S. Jagger as Rob McAlister
 Joseph DiMasso as 'Steady' Eddie
 Richard Wagner as Rick
 Demetri Watkins as Tom Dufresne
 Stephen Bridgewater as Dan Craine
 Amy Lawhorn as Leyla Dufresne
 Glen Matlock as himself

Production

Development
It was adapted from a short film entitled A Night at Robert McAlister’s. In 2009, the film premiered on Hollywood Boulevard for an audience of music and film industry personnel, including cast members of American television series Heroes. The short went on to win several awards at the Hoboken International Film Festival, as well as featuring at the 2011 Cannes Film Festival.

In November 2011, Screen Daily announced The Paddy Lincoln Gang alongside Anne Fontaine's Adore as upcoming 'hot projects'. While Variety were the first major outlet to reveal Sex Pistols founding-member Glen Matlock's involvement in the project.

Filming
The film was shot in various locations including Leeds and London, United Kingdom. Incorporating the original short film with new footage, the feature length draws non-sequential editing inspiration from Steven Soderbergh's crime film The Limey.

A docudrama scene was filmed backstage at a live festival performance from The Faces. Improvised between Sex Pistols bassist Glen Matlock and lead actor Dean S. Jagger.

Music
Musicians Matthew Steer and Colin 'Lizzard' McGuinness  were brought into the project to shape the sound of the fictional Paddy Lincoln Gang band. Hot Press featured 'Give Anger a Name' and covered U2 and Pearl Jam producer Tim Palmer's involvement in the soundtrack.

Release
The film held its US premiere at the SoCal Film Festival in Huntington Beach, California on 29 September 2012. Executive producer Graham Kentsley played an ambassadorial role for the Russian premiere in Volgograd on 28 October 2013, gaining a further selection for The Paddy Lincoln Gang at the 2014 Artsloy Festival, where he served on the expert board. On 3 May 2014, the film held its European debut at the UK premiere in St Albans, Hertfordshire. Kentsley fulfilled both panel and media duties with the festival and Herts Advertiser respectively, promoting the film.

Reception
The Paddy Lincoln Gang received positive reviews from its debut at the 2012 SoCal Film Festival, winning multiple awards including the 'Best in Fest' prize. It received an Oregon International Film Festival 'Platinum Award' that year.

References

External links
 The Paddy Lincoln Gang at the British Board of Film Classification

2012 films
2010s psychological drama films
2010s musical drama films
2012 psychological thriller films
American rock music films
British rock music films
Films shot in London
Features based on short films
British thriller drama films
2012 drama films
2010s English-language films
2010s American films
2010s British films